Unique hue is a term used in certain theories of color vision, which implies that human perception distinguishes between "unique" (psychologically primary) and composite (mixed) hues. A unique hue is defined as a color which an observer perceives as a pure, without any admixture of the other colors. Ewald Hering first defined the unique hues as red, green, yellow, and blue, and based them on the concept that these colors could not be simultaneously perceived. For example, a color cannot appear both red and green; the color would cancel out to yellow.

There is a great deal of variability when defining unique hues experimentally, however, a single observer can usually set their experience of a unique hue extremely consistently, to within a few nanometers. Unique hues can differ between people, and depend on the state of adaptation of the visual system. They are often used in psychophysical research to measure variations in color perception due to color abnormalities or color adaptation.

History

Hering's opponent process theory

The concept of certain hues as 'unique' came with the advent of Opponent process theory. Ewald Hering first proposed the idea that red, green, blue, and yellow were unique in 1892. His theory suggests that color vision is based on two opposing axes of color: a red-green axis and a blue-yellow axis. This theory is based strongly on the existence of perceptually impossible colors or color hue mixtures that have no meaning such as redgreen or yellowblue. These colors are perceptually impossible and suggest an opponent relationship between red and green, and blue and yellow. 

While this theory was initially considered contradictory to Young and Helmholtz’s trichromatic theory, the discovery of color-opponent cells in the retina and lateral geniculate nucleus (LGN) reconciled the two theories. It became widely accepted that the three cone types were recombined into three cone contrast pathways, two encoding color, and one encoding luminance, thereby reducing the redundancy of correlated cone signals. The axes proposed for these recombinations are commonly taken to be L+M, S-(L+M), and L-M.

Physiological evidence

The recombination of color signals into L+M, L-M, and S-(L+M) channels (often referred to as the cardinal axes, or dkl color space) makes clear predictions for the physiological correlate of unique hues. The L-M axis, corresponding to the red-green axis proposed by Hering, should produce unique hues when maximally stimulated at either pole. Similarly, the yellow-blue (S-(L+M)) axis should produce unique hues when it is maximally stimulated at either pole. Hering suggested that these mutually exclusive hues would correspond to the ‘building up’ (assimilation) or ‘breaking down’ (dissimilation) of a visual substance corresponding to the red-green or blue-yellow color axis. 

Later research suggested that unique hues could be defined as the ‘equilibrium state’ of the red-green or blue-yellow cardinal axes. This introduced the concept of ‘neutralisation’, where an equal stimulation of red and green light would cancel out to a neutral point on the red-green axis (which could correspond to yellow, white, or blue). 

However, later research suggests that the L-M and S-(L+M) axes do not correspond to the perceptual equivalent of red-green or yellow-blue. While unique hues do correspond to null points on the red-green/blue-yellow axes, the red-green/blue-yellow axes do not correspond to the L-M and S-(L+M) cardinal axes. Instead, unique hues seem to correspond to points at roughly the diagonals of the L-M and S-(L+M) axes. Furthermore, while color-opponent cells in the retina and LGN were proposed as a mechanism of hue cancellation and neutralisation, it has also been found that the inhibitory inputs of opponent cells are an order of magnitude smaller than the excitatory inputs, and therefore equal red and green hues will not cancel out within an opponent cell. Furthermore, cells in the LGN have been found that respond to cone combinations other than those of the cardinal axes, such as M-S. Therefore, the cardinal color contrast axes are not a direct correlate of our experience of unique hues, and unique hues cannot be explained by relative numbers of excited L- and M-cones or their sensitivities.

The physiological nature of unique hues remains unknown. Mollon and Jordan (1997) state: “…if we understood the status of unique hues we should probably understand something useful about the general question of neural representation and its relationship to conscious experience. For the present, the nature of the unique hues remains mysterious and we do not know whether they tell us anything about the neural organisation of the visual system.” However, some suggestions have been made to address the difference between color appearance and physiological color pathways. One suggestion is that there is a third recombination of cone signals at a point later than the LGN, and that this produces non-linear combinations resulting in our experience of color being non-linear to the cardinal axes. Another suggestion is that hues are learned based on variations in the visual environment; that unique hues represent an adaptation away from the cardinal axes. 

There is mixed evidence as to whether unique hues are perceptually privileged compared to other colors. Some research suggests that there is no greater sensitivity for unique hues compared to other colors, but other evidence suggests there is greater sensitivity for yellows and blues, which may be due to them coinciding with the daylight locus. There is no direct evidence that larger populations of neurons are dedicated to unique hues compared to other colors, but some EEG research suggests that the latency of some EEG components may be shorter for unique hues compared to non-unique hues, and that colors can be decoded with a higher accuracy from EEG signals when they are unique hues.

Use in psychophysics

Unique hues are a useful tool in measuring variability in color perception. Neitz et al (2002) show that unique yellow shifts exponentially towards longer wavelengths following multi-day adaptation to red environments, and is also shifted for deuteranomalous colorblind observers. The researchers interpret these results as suggesting a long-term normalisation mechanism which can change the weighting of cone inputs to compensate for global changes in illumination, allowing color vision to remain optimal in a changing chromatic environment. Unique hues have also been shown to change over the course of the year as a result of adaptation to differences in the color spectrum of the environment in summer compared to winter, and have been shown to change after surgery to remove cataracts.

Cultural variability
Unique hues have played an important role in understanding linguistic relativity or the idea that language has a significant influence on thought. The way in which language and culture affects color naming is debated and not yet fully understood. The Universalist side of the debate argues that unique color terms are biologically tied to the human visual system and are the same regardless of language and culture. The Relativist side argues that language contextualizes thought and therefore perception, the idea being that having a different environment and culture causes the perception of the individual to be different.

See also 
 
 Color wheel
 Natural Color System
 Tincture (heraldry), a color system in correspondence with the unique hues

References

Color
Visual perception